Dicharax is a genus of air-breathing land snails, terrestrial pulmonate gastropod mollusks in the family Alycaeidae.

Species
Species within the genus Dicharax include:
 
 Dicharax abdoui Páll-Gergely, 2017
 Dicharax abei (Kuroda, 1951)
 Dicharax akhaensis (Godwin-Austen, 1914)
 Dicharax akioi (Kuroda & Abe, 1980)
 Dicharax akiratadai (Minato, 1982)
 Dicharax alticola Páll-Gergely & Hunyadi, 2017
 Dicharax ananensis (Yano, Akira & H. Matsuda, 2013)
 Dicharax anonymus (Godwin-Austen, 1914)
 Dicharax anthostoma (Möllendorff, 1885)
 Dicharax asaluensis (Godwin-Austen, 1914)
 Dicharax ataranensis (Godwin-Austen, 1914)
 Dicharax avae (W. T. Blanford, 1863)
 Dicharax barowliensis (Godwin-Austen, 1914)
 Dicharax bawai Aravind & Páll-Gergely, 2018
 Dicharax bicrenatus (Godwin-Austen, 1874)
 Dicharax biexcisus (Pilsbry, 1902)
 Dicharax bifrons (Theobald, 1870)
 Dicharax birugosus (Godwin-Austen, 1893)
 Dicharax bison Páll-Gergely & Hunyadi, 2017
 Dicharax blanfordi (Godwin-Austen, 1914)
 Dicharax borealis Jirapatrasilp & Páll-Gergely, 2021
 Dicharax burchi Jirapatrasilp & Páll-Gergely, 2021
 Dicharax burroiensis (Godwin-Austen, 1914)
 Dicharax candrakirana Nurinsiyah & Hausdorf, 2017
 Dicharax caudapiscis Páll-Gergely & Hunyadi, 2018
 Dicharax chennelli (Godwin-Austen, 1886)
 Dicharax conicus (Godwin-Austen, 1871)
 Dicharax crassicollis (van Benthem Jutting, 1959)
 Dicharax crenatus (Godwin-Austen, 1871)
 Dicharax crispatus (Godwin-Austen, 1871)
 Dicharax cristatus (Möllendorff, 1886)
 Dicharax cucullatus (Theobald, 1870)
 Dicharax cyclophoroides (Pilsbry & Y. Hirase, 1909)
 Dicharax daflaensis (Godwin-Austen, 1876)
 Dicharax dalingensis (Godwin-Austen, 1914)
 Dicharax damsangensis (Godwin-Austen, 1886)
 Dicharax depressus (Bavay & Dautzenberg, 1912)
 Dicharax diagonius (Godwin-Austen, 1871)
 Dicharax digitatus (H. F. Blanford, 1871)
 Dicharax diminutus (Heude, 1885)
 Dicharax diplochilus (Möllendorff, 1887)
 Dicharax dohertyi (Godwin-Austen, 1893)
 Dicharax dolichodeiros (Heude, 1890)
 Dicharax draco Páll-Gergely & Hunyadi, 2017
 Dicharax duoculmen (Godwin-Austen, 1914)
 Dicharax duorugosus (Godwin-Austen, 1914)
 Dicharax edei (Godwin-Austen, 1914)
 Dicharax elevatus (Heude, 1886)
 Dicharax ellipticus Páll-Gergely, 2017
 Dicharax expanstoma (Minato, 1982)
 Dicharax expatriatus (W. T. Blanford & H. F. Blanford, 1860)
 Dicharax fargesianus (Heude, 1885)
 Dicharax fimbriatus (Bavay & Dautzenberg, 1912)
 Dicharax footei (W. T. Blanford & H. F. Blanford, 1861)
 Dicharax fraterculus (Bavay & Dautzenberg, 1900)
 Dicharax gemma (Godwin-Austen, 1914)
 Dicharax gemmula (Benson, 1859)
 Dicharax generosus (Godwin-Austen, 1914)
 Dicharax glaber (W. T. Blanford, 1865)
 Dicharax globulus (Godwin-Austen, 1874)
 Dicharax habiangensis (Godwin-Austen, 1914)
 Dicharax hebes (Benson, 1857)
 Dicharax humilis (W. T. Blanford, 1862)
 Dicharax imitator Páll-Gergely & Hunyadi, 2017
 Dicharax immaculatus Páll-Gergely, 2017
 Dicharax ingrami (W. T. Blanford, 1862)
 Dicharax itonis (Kuroda, 1943)
 Dicharax jaintiacus (Godwin-Austen, 1871)
 Dicharax japonicus (Martens, 1865)
 Dicharax kezamaensis (Godwin-Austen, 1914)
 Dicharax khasiacus (Godwin-Austen, 1871)
 Dicharax kiuchii (Minato & Abe, 1982)
 Dicharax kurodatokubeii (Minato, 1987)
 Dicharax kurzianus (Theobald & Stoliczka, 1872)
 Dicharax lahupaensis (Godwin-Austen, 1914)
 Dicharax lectus (Godwin-Austen, 1914)
 Dicharax lenticulus (Godwin-Austen, 1874)
 Dicharax levis (Godwin-Austen, 1914)
 Dicharax logtakensis (Godwin-Austen, 1914)
 Dicharax longituba (Martens, 1864)
 Dicharax magnus (Godwin-Austen, 1893)
 Dicharax maosmaiensis (Godwin-Austen, 1922)
 Dicharax microcostatus Páll-Gergely, 2017
 Dicharax microdiscus (Möllendorff, 1887)
 Dicharax micropolitus Páll-Gergely & Hunyadi, 2017
 Dicharax miyazakii (Takahashi & Habe, 1973)
 Dicharax moellendorffi (Kobelt & Möllendorff, 1897)
 Dicharax montanus G. Nevill, 1881
 Dicharax multirugosus (Godwin-Austen, 1874)
 Dicharax muspratti (Godwin-Austen, 1914)
 Dicharax mutatus (Godwin-Austen, 1876)
 Dicharax nagaensis (Godwin-Austen, 1871)
 Dicharax nakashimai (Minato, 1987)
 Dicharax nattoungensis (Godwin-Austen, 1914)
 Dicharax nishii (Minato, 2005)
 Dicharax nitidus (W. T. Blanford, 1862)
 Dicharax nongtungensis (Godwin-Austen, 1914)
 Dicharax notatus (Godwin-Austen, 1876)
 Dicharax notus (Godwin-Austen, 1914)
 Dicharax nowgongensis (Godwin-Austen, 1914)
 Dicharax obscurus (Godwin-Austen, 1914)
 Dicharax ochraceus (Godwin-Austen, 1893)
 Dicharax okamurai (Azuma, 1980)
 Dicharax okinawaensis (K. Uozumi, Yamamoto & Habe, 1979)
 Dicharax oligopleuris (Möllendorff, 1887)
 Dicharax omissus (Godwin-Austen, 1914)
 Dicharax oshimanus (Pilsbry & Y. Hirase, 1904)
 Dicharax pachitaensis (Godwin-Austen, 1886)
 Dicharax panhai Jirapatrasilp & Páll-Gergely, 2021
 Dicharax panshiensis (Chen, 1989)
 Dicharax parvulus (Möllendorff, 1887)
 Dicharax peilei (Preston, 1914)
 Dicharax placenovitas (Minato, 1981)
 Dicharax planorbulus (Heude, 1885)
 Dicharax plectocheilus (Benson, 1859)
 Dicharax plicilabris (Möllendorff, 1886)
 Dicharax politus (W. T. Blanford, 1865)
 Dicharax pongrati Jirapatrasilp & Tongkerd, 2021
 Dicharax pratatensis (Panha & Burch, 1997)
 Dicharax purus (Pilsbry & Y. Hirase, 1904)
 Dicharax pusillus (Godwin-Austen, 1871)
 Dicharax rechilaensis (Godwin-Austen, 1914)
 Dicharax robustus Páll-Gergely & Hunyadi, 2017
 Dicharax sandowayensis (Godwin-Austen, 1914)
 Dicharax sculpturus (Godwin-Austen, 1875)
 Dicharax serratus (Godwin-Austen, 1874)
 Dicharax shiibaensis (Minato, 2005)
 Dicharax shiosakimasahiroi (Yano, H. Matsuda & Nishi, 2016)
 Dicharax sonlaensis (Raheem & S. Schneider, 2017)
 Dicharax spiracellum (Adams & Reeve, 1850)
 Dicharax stoliczkii (Godwin-Austen, 1874)
 Dicharax strangulatus (L. Pfeiffer, 1846)
 Dicharax strigatus (Godwin-Austen, 1874)
 Dicharax stuparum Páll-Gergely & Hunyadi, 2018
 Dicharax subculmen (Godwin-Austen, 1893)
 Dicharax subhumilis (Möllendorff, 1897)
 Dicharax succineus (W. T. Blanford, 1862)
 Dicharax sylheticus (Godwin-Austen, 1914)
 Dicharax tadai (Kuroda & Kawamoto, 1956)
 Dicharax takahashii (Habe, 1976)
 Dicharax tanegashimae (Pilsbry, 1902)
 Dicharax tangmaiensis (D.-N. Chen & G.-Q. Zhang, 2001)
 Dicharax theobaldi (W. T. Blanford, 1862)
 Dicharax tokunoshimanus (Pilsbry & Y. Hirase, 1904)
 Dicharax tsushimanus (Pilsbry & Y. Hirase, 1909)
 Dicharax umbonalis (Benson, 1856)
 Dicharax vestitus (W. T. Blanford, 1862)
 Dicharax woodthorpi (Godwin-Austen, 1914)
 Dicharax yanoshigehumii (Minato, 1987)
 Dicharax yanoshokoae (Yano & H. Matsuda, 2016)

Species brought into synonymy
 Dicharax canaliculatus (Möllendorff, 1894): synonym of Chamalycaeus canaliculatus (Möllendorff, 1894) (unaccepted combination)
 Dicharax crenulatus (Benson, 1859): synonym of Metalycaeus crenulatus (Benson, 1859) (unaccepted combination)
 Dicharax davisi (Godwin-Austen, 1914): synonym of Dicharax cucullatus (Theobald, 1870) (junior synonym)
 Dicharax neglectus (Heude, 1885): synonym of Metalycaeus rathouisianus (Heude, 1882) (unaccepted combination)
 Dicharax neglectus (Godwin-Austen, 1914): synonym of Metalycaeus godwinausteni Páll-Gergely, 2020 (invalid: senior homonym of Alycaeus neglectus Heude, 1885)
 Dicharax prosectus (Benson, 1857): synonym of Metalycaeus prosectus (Benson, 1857) (unaccepted combination)
 Dicharax rugosus (Godwin-Austen, 1914): synonym of Metalycaeus rugosus (Godwin-Austen, 1914) (unaccepted combination)
 Dicharax stylifer (Benson, 1857): synonym of Metalycaeus stylifer (Benson, 1857) (unaccepted combination)
 Dicharax teriaensis (Godwin-Austen, 1914): synonym of Metalycaeus teriaensis (Godwin-Austen, 1914) (unaccepted combination)
 Dicharax toruputuensis (Godwin-Austen, 1914): synonym of Metalycaeus toruputuensis (Godwin-Austen, 1914) (unaccepted combination)

References

 Kuroda, T. (1943). New Land Shells from Tyugoku District (1) : A New Species belonging to a New Subgenus of the Genus Chamalycaeus. Venus (Japanese Journal of Malacology). 13(1-4): 7-11.
  Kuroda, T. (1951). On Awalycaeus abei, gen. et sp. nov. (Cyclophoridae)(The Celebration Number of Mr. T. Kanamaru's 60th Birthday). Venus (Japanese Journal of Malacology). 17(3): 73-74.

External links

 Benson, W. H. (1859). A sectional distribution of the genus Alycæus, Gray, with characters of six new species and of other Cyclostomidæ collected at Darjiling by W. T. Blanford, Esq., Geol. Survey. The Annals and Magazine of Natural History, Ser. 3. 3: 176–184
 Kobelt, W. & Möllendorff, O. von. (1900). Zur Systematik der Pneumonopomen. Nachrichtsblatt der Deutschen Malakozoologischen Gesellschaft. 32(11-12): 186
 Páll-Gergely, B., Sajan, S., Tripathy, B., Meng, K., Asami, T. & Ablett, J.D. (2020). Genus-level revision of the Alycaeidae (Gastropoda: Cyclophoroidea), with an annotated species catalog. ZooKeys. 981: 1–220
 G. K. (1921). Mollusca. III. Land Operculates. Cyclophoridae, Truncatellidae, Assimineidae, Helicinidae.). In: Shipley, A. E. & Marshall, G. A. K. (eds.):. The Fauna of British India, including Ceylon and Burma. I–XIV, 386 pp. London (Taylor & Francis).

Cyclophoroidea